Matteo Piacentini (born 20 April 1999) is an Italian footballer who plays as a defender for  club Triestina on loan from Modena.

Club career

Sassuolo

Loan to Teramo 
On 17 July 2018, Piacentini was loaned to Serie C club Teramo on a season-long loan deal. On 30 September he made his Serie C debut for Teramo as a substitute replacing Riccardo Mastrilli in the 46th minute of a 1–1 home draw against Gubbio. One week later, on 7 October he played his first entire match for Teramo, a 3–1 away defeat against FeralpiSalò. Piacentini ended his season-long loan to Teramo with 23 appearances, including 20 as a starter, and 1 assist.

Modena
On 5 January 2022, he signed a 2.5-year contract with Modena. On 31 January 2023, Piacentini was loaned to Triestina.

Career statistics

Club

Honours

Club 
Sassuolo Primavera

 Torneo di Viareggio: 2017

References

External links
 

1999 births
Living people
People from Sassuolo
Sportspeople from the Province of Modena
Footballers from Emilia-Romagna
Italian footballers
Association football defenders
Serie C players
Serie B players
U.S. Sassuolo Calcio players
S.S. Teramo Calcio players
Modena F.C. 2018 players
U.S. Triestina Calcio 1918 players